Herefordshire Council elections are held every four years. Herefordshire Council is the local authority for the unitary authority and ceremonial county of Herefordshire in England. Since the last boundary changes in 2015, 53 councillors have been elected from 53 wards.

Political control
Herefordshire County Council was first established in 1889 under the Local Government Act 1888. The county council was abolished in 1974, with the area merging with neighbouring Worcestershire to become a new non-metropolitan county called Hereford and Worcester, with Hereford and Worcester County Council serving as the higher-tier authority of the new county. Hereford and Worcester was abolished 24 years later and split back into separate ceremonial counties of Herefordshire and Worcestershire, with Herefordshire Council being established in 1998 as the council for the new unitary authority of Herefordshire (formally being a district council which also performs the functions of a county council). Herefordshire Council replaced the districts of Hereford, South Herefordshire, most of Leominster and part of Malvern Hills, and also took over the county-level functions of the abolished Hereford and Worcester County Council. The first elections to the new Herefordshire Council were held in 1997, initially operating as a shadow authority until the new arrangements came into effect on 1 April 1998. Political control of the council since 1998 has been held by the following parties:

Leadership
The leaders of the council since 1998 have been:

Council elections
1997 Herefordshire Council election
2000 Herefordshire Council election
2003 Herefordshire Council election
2007 Herefordshire Council election
2011 Herefordshire Council election
2015 Herefordshire Council election (new ward boundaries)
2019 Herefordshire Council election

By-election results

1997–2000

2000–2003

2003–2007

2007–2011

2019–2023

References

External links
Herefordshire Council
2011 BBC election results for Herefordshire
By-election results 

 
Unitary authority elections in England
Elections in Herefordshire
Council elections in the West Midlands (region)